Three Modern Women is a 1933 Chinese film directed by Bu Wancang and written by Tian Han. The film tells a story about the romantic relationships between a movie star and three women representing three archetypes of contemporary women. Released by the Lianhua Film Company, it was highly popular and won praise from left-wing critics.

It is considered a lost film.

Cast 
Ruan Lingyu
Chen Yen-yen
Lai Cheuk-Cheuk
Jin Yan

See also
New Women – 1935 film directed by Cai Chusheng
Women Side by Side – 1949 film directed by Chen Liting
List of Chinese films of the 1930s

References 

Films directed by Bu Wancang
1933 drama films
1933 films
Films set in Shanghai
Lianhua Film Company films
Chinese silent films
Films set in the Republic of China (1912–1949)
Lost Chinese films
Chinese drama films
1933 lost films
Silent drama films